Bermuda Dunes is a census-designated place (CDP) in Riverside County, California. The population was 7,282 at the 2010 census.

The community's former name was Myoma. The Bermuda Dunes Country Club was developed in 1958 by Ernie Dunlevie and Ray Ryan; it attracted celebrities such as Clark Gable as members. Bermuda Dunes is served by the Bermuda Dunes Airport.

Geography
Bermuda Dunes is located at  (33.745, -116.285).

The CDP's name originated from the Bermuda Dunes country club, a golf course community designed by William Francis Bell first opened in 1962 and the former site of the Bob Hope Chrysler Golf Classic. There are 10 other golf clubs and communities within the  radius, including Sun City Palm Desert. Bermuda Dunes Airport is located in the community.

Public services
The area's public services: Education – the Desert Sands Unified School District, plus a private school: Christian Schools of the Desert, which is a preschool – grade 12 school. Electricity is provided by the Indio-based Imperial Irrigation District and Southern California Edison across Washington Street. Water is provided by both the IID and the Myoma Dunes Water Company  and telephone landlines are provided by Verizon.

Bermuda Dunes shares two ZIP codes with Indio: 92201 and 92203. The telephone area codes are 760 and 442.

Terrain and climate 
Located in the Coachella Valley desert region, Bermuda Dunes is sheltered by the San Jacinto Mountains to the west, the Santa Rosa Mountains to the south and by the Little San Bernardino Mountains to the east. This geography gives Bermuda Dunes its hot, dry climate, with 354 days of sunshine and only  of rain annually.

Demographics

2010
At the 2010 census, Bermuda Dunes had a population of 7,282. The racial makeup of Bermuda Dunes was 5,433 (74.6%) White, (60.2% Non-Hispanic White), 180 (2.5%) African American, 63 (0.9%) Native American, 241 (3.3%) Asian, 11 (0.2%) Pacific Islander, 1,126 (15.5%) from other races, and 228 (3.1%) from two or more races. Hispanic or Latino of any race were 2,371 persons (32.6%).

The census reported that 7,277 people (99.9% of the population) lived in households, 5 (0.1%) lived in non-institutionalized group quarters, and no one was institutionalized.

There were 2,942 households, 927 (31.5%) had children under the age of 18 living in them, 1,456 (49.5%) were opposite-sex married couples living together, 349 (11.9%) had a female householder with no husband present, 178 (6.1%) had a male householder with no wife present. There were 252 (8.6%) unmarried opposite-sex partnerships, and 32 (1.1%) same-sex married couples or partnerships. 678 households (23.0%) were one person and 211 (7.2%) had someone living alone who was 65 or older. The average household size was 2.47. There were 1,983 families (67.4% of households); the average family size was 2.92.

The age distribution was 1,640 people (22.5%) under the age of 18, 670 people (9.2%) aged 18 to 24, 1,823 people (25.0%) aged 25 to 44, 2,051 people (28.2%) aged 45 to 64, and 1,098 people (15.1%) who were 65 or older. The median age was 39.1 years. For every 100 females, there were 98.1 males. For every 100 females age 18 and over, there were 93.9 males.

There were 3,639 housing units at an average density of 1,235.2 per square mile, of the occupied units 1,741 (59.2%) were owner-occupied and 1,201 (40.8%) were rented. The homeowner vacancy rate was 4.4%; the rental vacancy rate was 19.8%. 4,252 people (58.4% of the population) lived in owner-occupied housing units and 3,025 people (41.5%) lived in rental housing units.

During 2009–2013, Bermuda Dunes had a median household income of $61,519, with 9.4% of the population living below the poverty line.

2000
At the 2000 census there were 6,229 people, 2,595 households, and 1,686 families in the CDP. The racial makeup of the CDP was 84.2% White, 2.1% Black or African American, 0.6% Native American, 2.8% Asian, 0.1% Pacific Islander, 6.9% from other races, and 3.4% from two or more races. 19.5% of the population were Hispanic or Latino of any race, but the statistic isn't regarded accurate by the United States Hispanic Chamber of Commerce, placed the CDP's Hispanic percentage well above 30 percent.
Of the 2,595 households 30.4% had children under the age of 18 living with them, 51.2% were married couples living together, 9.6% had a female householder with no husband present, and 35.0% were non-families. 25.6% of households were one person and 8.4% were one person aged 65 or older. The average household size was 2.4 and the average family size was 2.9.

The age distribution was 23.6% under the age of 18, 8.9% from 18 to 24, 29.8% from 25 to 44, 23.6% from 45 to 64, and 14.1% 65 or older. The median age was 38 years. For every 100 females, there were 99.6 males. For every 100 females age 18 and over, there were 95.8 males. Many retirees (senior citizens) and families with young children moved to Bermuda Dunes enough to have a balance in age demographics.

The median household income was $51,082 and the median family income  was $62,453. Males had a median income of $43,900 versus $31,654 for females. The per capita income for the CDP was $29,343. About 4.5% of families and 6.9% of the population were below the poverty line, including 6.2% of those under age 18 and 2.2% of those age 65 or over.

Median house value: $208,400 (year 2000), but said to increased 300 percent by 2006 ($550,000) to peak at 2009 (over $600,000) before the Great Recession.

Politics
In the Riverside County Board of Supervisors, Thousand Palms is in 4th District, Represented by Democrat V. Manuel Perez Supervisor of the 4th District

Notable people 
 John J. Benoit (1951–2016), California law enforcement officer and politician
 Rock Hudson, actor, owned a house in Bermuda Dunes. Author Armistead Maupin edited Tales of the City in the house.
  Casey Merrill, former running back of the Green Bay Packers, New York Giants and New Orleans Saints (NFL).

References

External links
 The Desert Sun, Coachella Valley Newspaper
 Bermuda Dunes Airport

Census-designated places in Riverside County, California
Populated places in the Colorado Desert
Coachella Valley
Indio, California
Census-designated places in California